Marripelligudem is a top 3 Village in Kamalapur Mandal in Hanamakonda of Telangana, India.

Marripelligudem Pin code is 505102.
This Place is in the border of the Hanamakonda District and Karimnagar District.

Cities and towns in Karimnagar district

Marripalligudem is a place where most of the Engineers, Doctors, Sports persons, soldiers started their services to the society. Here the villagers continuously participates on multiple cultural activities for every festival.